Tritan is a copolymer offered by Eastman Chemical Company since 2007 to replace polycarbonate, because of health concerns about Bisphenol A (BPA).  Tritan is a copolymer made from three monomers: dimethyl terephthalate (DMT), cyclohexanedimethanol (CHDM), and 2,2,4,4-tetramethyl-1,3-cyclobutanediol (CBDO).  Tritan is made without using any BPA.

In April 2008, Nalgene announced it would phase out production of its outdoor line of polycarbonate containers containing the chemical bisphenol A. Nalgene then used Tritan, because it did not contain BPA.

Health controversy
In 2011, a neurobiologist at the University of Texas, George Bittner, published an article claiming most polymers, including Tritan, contained trace amounts of Bisphenol A.

Eastman Chemical Company sued, and after a jury ruled in Eastman's favor, the Court barred Bittner from making claims about Tritan’s oestrogenic activity.

References

Polycarbonates
Commodity chemicals
Plastics
Thermoplastics
Transparent materials